Poglajen is a surname. Notable people with the surname include:
 Cristian Poglajen (born 1989), Argentinian volleyball player
 Martin Poglajen (born 1942), Dutch judoka